Moosa Yaamin (born 29 December 1992) is a Maldivian footballer, who is currently playing for New Radiant.

Senior career

Thoddoo FC
Yaamin made his debut for Thoddoo FC at the age of 17 where they lost 3–0 to Victory in a Dhivehi League match on 11 April 2010, coming in to play in the starting of the second half as a substitute. He was also cautioned with a yellow card for the foul against Mukhthar Naseer inside the penalty area, awarding a penalty for Victory. He started his first game for his club in their Dhivehi League's 2–1 loss against Maziya on 18 April 2010. On 6 May 2010, he played the match, lasting on the pitch for full 90 minutes in the 2–0 win against Vyansa.

Club All Youth Linkage
Yaamin made his Dhivehi League debut for AYL on 2 April 2011, starting in a 2–0 win against Vyansa. He played his first match lasting 90 minutes for AYL, in the following 3–1 loss in the Dhivehi League against New Radiant on 9 April 2011.

In his first ever FA Cup campaign, he made his debut in the quarter finals against VB Addu FC on 11 September 2012. The match ended as a 2–2 draw in the full-time, and both sides couldn't find a winner in the extra time. They surprisingly beat the Champions 4–2 in the Penalty shoot-out, Yaamin hitting the net with the ball in the deciding penalty and advancing his side to the semi finals.

Career statistics

Club

International career
Yaamin made his debut in the Maldives' last match of 2012 Nehru Cup, in which they lost 3–1 to Cameroon on 29 August 2012, coming on to play in the 80th minute, replacing Assadhulla Abdulla.

References

1992 births
Living people
Maldivian footballers
Maldives international footballers
New Radiant S.C. players
People from Thoddoo
Association football midfielders
Footballers at the 2014 Asian Games
Asian Games competitors for the Maldives
Maziya S&RC players